SRTV may refer to:

 one of the following television stations:
 Star Ray TV in Toronto, Ontario
 Romanian Television, the Romanian public television
 the student run television station at the University of California, San Diego, which originated such programs as Live Hot Puppet Chat and various shows by The Koala
 the Department of the Army's Soldiers Media Center that produces radio and television programming (Soldiers Radio and Television)
 Storm Search and Rescue Tactical Vehicle, US. Air Force ATV